Perfect Hair may refer to:

 Perfect Hair (album), a 2014 studio album by American rapper Busdriver
 "Perfect Hair", a song by Danger Doom from the album The Mouse and the Mask

See also
 Perfect Hair Forever, an American comedy animated television series